Cylindera terricola, the variable tiger beetle, is a species of flashy tiger beetle in the family Carabidae. It is found in North America.

Subspecies
These six subspecies belong to the species Cylindera terricola:
 Cylindera terricola cinctipennis (LeConte, 1846)
 Cylindera terricola continua (Knaus, 1923) (interior tiger beetle)
 Cylindera terricola imperfecta (LeConte, 1851)
 Cylindera terricola kaibabensis (W. N. Johnson, 1990)
 Cylindera terricola susanagreae (Kippenhan, 2007) (Susan's tiger beetle)
 Cylindera terricola terricola (Say, 1824)

References

Further reading

 

terricola
Articles created by Qbugbot
Beetles described in 1824